Ophionectria portoricensis is a species of fungus that was first described by Carlos E. Chardón in 1921.

References

Nectriaceae
Fungi described in 1921